Jorge Maximiliano Lombi Etulain (born November 1, 1971 in Buenos Aires) is a field hockey player from Argentina, who made his debut for the national squad in 1991 in a friendly against Spain.

Lombi also plays for the Hyderabad Sultans in the Indian Premier Hockey League. In the fall of 2008 he was dismissed from the national team.

See also
List of men's field hockey players with 100 or more international goals

References

External links
 

1971 births
Living people
Argentine male field hockey players
Olympic field hockey players of Argentina
Field hockey players from Buenos Aires
Field hockey players at the 1996 Summer Olympics
Field hockey players at the 2000 Summer Olympics
2002 Men's Hockey World Cup players
Field hockey players at the 2004 Summer Olympics
Field hockey players at the 2007 Pan American Games
Pan American Games gold medalists for Argentina
Pan American Games silver medalists for Argentina
Pan American Games medalists in field hockey
Medalists at the 2007 Pan American Games
Medalists at the 1995 Pan American Games
21st-century Argentine people